The 2013 Chill Perth 360 was a motor race meeting for the Australasian sedan-based V8 Supercars. It was the fourth event of the 2013 International V8 Supercars Championship. Three races were held during the race meeting.

Triple Eight Race Engineering dominated the event, taking all three race wins. Craig Lowndes won the 60/60 Sprint race on Saturday with team-mate Jamie Whincup winning the remaining two races on Sunday.

Championship standings after the race
 After 12 of 36 races.

Drivers' Championship standings

Teams' Championship standings

 Note: Only the top five positions are included for both sets of standings.

Chill
May 2013 events in Australia